David Dallas Taylor (December 15, 1926 – August 11, 1983) was an American murderer who was on the FBI Ten Most Wanted Fugitives list in 1953.

Background
Taylor had held jobs as a service station attendant, electrician, plumber, autobody repairman, and grill man in restaurants. A career criminal, Taylor had been serving a jail sentence in Jasper, Alabama for grand larceny when he killed an elderly guard to escape; the first of four prison escapes prior to his addition to the most wanted list in 1953. He was a "persuasive talker" with a Southern accent who was always armed with a gun and switchblade.

Escape and capture
Taylor escaped from a train on September 1, 1952 while being transported from Chicago, Illinois back to Alabama following a previous escape, and was added to the list on March 3, 1953. He was captured by FBI agents on May 26, 1953 in Chicago while "caught in a traffic jam".

References

External links
FBI Ten Most Wanted Fugitives by year 1953

1926 births
1983 deaths
American murderers
Fugitives